Paditha Penn is a 1956 Indian Tamil-language film  directed by M. Thiruvenkadam. The film stars N. N. Kannappa and Rajasulochana.

Cast
List adapted from the database of Film News Anandan and from Thiraikalanjiyam.

Male cast
N. N. Kannappa
M. N. Nambiar
V. K. Ramasamy

Female cast
Rajasulochana
Tambaram Lalitha
Susheela

Production
The film was directed by M. Thiruvenkadam. Screenplay and dialogues were written by A. S. Muthu.

This is the first film Pattukkottai Kalyanasundaram wrote lyrics for.

Soundtrack
Music was composed by Arun and Raghavan while the lyrics were penned by Pattukkottai Kalyanasundaram, Thanjai N. Ramaiah Dass, Kavi. Lakshmanadas and Aroordas. Playback singers are Thiruchi Loganathan, A. M. Rajah, S. C. Krishnan, Jikki, N. L. Ganasaraswathi and K. Rani.

References

1950s Tamil-language films